Conforte is a surname. Notable people with the surname include:

David Conforte (c. 1618 – c. 1685), Greek-born Hebrew literary historian and writer
Joe Conforte (1925–2019), American brothel owner

See also 
Comfort (disambiguation)
Confort
Conforti, a related Italian surname
Conforto